The Ela River is a  river in eastern New Hampshire in the United States. It is a tributary of the Cochecho River, part of the Piscataqua River watershed leading to the Atlantic Ocean.

Flowing south through Club Pond, the river turns southeast and descends to Farmington, where it joins the Cochecho. New Hampshire Route 11 parallels the river for most of its southeasterly course.

See also

List of rivers of New Hampshire

References

Rivers of New Hampshire
Rivers of Strafford County, New Hampshire